Legend tripping is a name bestowed by folklorists and anthropologists on an adolescent practice (containing elements of a rite of passage) in which a usually furtive nocturnal pilgrimage is made to a site which is alleged to have been the scene of some tragic, horrific, and possibly supernatural event or haunting.  The practice mostly involves the visiting of sites endemic to locations identified in local Urban legends.  Legend tripping has been documented most thoroughly to date in the United States.

Sites for legend trips 
While the stories that attach to the sites of legend tripping vary from place to place, and sometimes contain a kernel of historical truth, there are a number of motifs and recurring themes in the legends and the sites.  Abandoned buildings, remote bridges, tunnels, caves, rural roads, specific woods or other uninhabited (or semi-uninhabited) areas, and especially cemeteries are frequent sites of legend-tripping pilgrimages.

Reactions and controversies 

Legend-tripping is a mostly harmless, perhaps even beneficial, youth recreation. It allows young people to demonstrate their courage in a place where the actual physical risk is likely slight. However, in what Ellis calls "ostensive abuse," the rituals enacted at the legend-tripping sites sometimes involve trespassing, vandalism, and other misdemeanors, and sometimes acts of animal sacrifice or other blood ritual. These transgressions then sometimes lead to local moral panics that involve adults in the community, and sometimes even the mass media.  These panics often further embellish the prestige of the legend trip to the adolescent mind. In at least one notorious case, years of destructive legend-tripping, amounting to an "ostensive frenzy," led to the fatal shooting of a legend-tripper near Lincoln, Nebraska followed by the wounding of the woman whose house had become the focus of the ostension. The panic over youth Satanism in the 1980s was fueled in part by graffiti and other ritual activities engaged in by legend-tripping youths.

Associated places in the United States 
 The Baird Chair monument in Kirksville, Missouri
 Bachelor's Grove Cemetery, outside of Chicago, Cook County, Illinois
 The Black Agnes statue, formerly in Pikesville, Maryland and now in Washington, DC
 The Black Angel monument at Oakland Cemetery in Iowa City, Iowa.
 Bunny Man Bridge near Clifton, Virginia
 Crawford Road in Yorktown, Virginia
 Devil's Tramping Ground south of Siler City, North Carolina, near Harper's Crossroads.
 Goat Man's Grave near Rolla, Missouri.
 Hexenkopf Rock in Williams Township, Pennsylvania

 The Hornet Spook Light twelve miles southwest of Joplin, Missouri
 The Lake View Public School, also known as the  Gore Orphanage, near Cleveland, Ohio
 McHarry, Captain Frances burial spot in Harrison County, Indiana
 Manteno State Hospital in Manteno, Illinois
 Mudhouse Mansion in Fairfield County, Ohio
 The Myrtle Hill Cemetery in Medina County, Ohio
 New Jersey Pine Barrens, said to be home to the Jersey Devil
 Old Alton Bridge south of Denton, Texas
 Old Louisville, reported to be the most haunted neighborhood in the United States
 Ong's Hat, New Jersey 
 Our Lady of the Angels School in Chicago, Illinois and its Fire Memorial in nearby Queen of Heaven Cemetery.
 The Pope Lick Trestle in Louisville, Kentucky, home to the satyr-like Pope Lick Monster
 Rehmeyer's Hollow in Shrewsbury, Pennsylvania
 Satansville on Cossart Road near Chadds Ford, Pennsylvania
 Stull Cemetery in Stull, Kansas, claimed to be a "gateway to Hell"
 Sweet Hollow Road and Mount Misery Road in Huntington, New York
 Waverly Hills Sanatorium, an abandoned hospital for tuberculosis victims, in Louisville, Kentucky

See also 
 Bloody Mary (folklore)
 Ghost hunting
 Haunted house
 Kimodameshi
 Stand by Me (film)
 The Devil's Chair (urban legend)

References

Further reading
 Aliens, Ghosts, and Cults: Legends We Live, by Bill Ellis (2001) 
 Encyclopedia of Haunted Indiana, Kobrowski, Nicole, 2008. 
 Legend Tripping: A Contemporary Legend Casebook. Logan: Utah State University Press; McNeill, Lynne S. and Elizabeth Tucker, eds.; 2018.
 Legend-Tripping Online: Supernatural Folklore and the Search for Ong's Hat, Michael Kinsella, (2011) 
 "Legend Tripping: The Ultimate Family Experience, Robinson, Robert C., 2014. 
 Lucifer Ascending: The Occult in Folklore and Popular Culture, by Bill Ellis (2004) 
 Raising the Devil: Satanism, New Religions, and the Media, by Bill Ellis (2000) 
 
 ''What's in a coin? Reading the Material Culture of Legend Tripping and Other Activities (2007), by Donald H. Holly and Casey E. Cordy. The Journal of American Folklore 120 (477):335-354.

American folklore
Death customs
Rites of passage
Pilgrimage
Urban legends